Mansurabad (also Romanized as Manşūrābād and Mansoor Abad) is a village in Sardrud-e Olya Rural District, Sardrud District, Razan County, Hamadan Province, Iran. At the 2006 census, its population was 331, in 68 families.

References 

Populated places in Razan County